Reg Harding (27 September 1945 – 11 August 2014) was an English professional darts player, who played in Professional Darts Corporation events.

Career
Harding played in five PDC World Darts Championships between 1999 and 2003, although he never got past the Last 32.

Harding died in August 2014 after a battle with cancer.

World Championship performances

PDC
 1999: Last 32: (lost to Phil Taylor 0–3) (sets) 
 2000: Last 32: (lost to Alex Roy 0–3)
 2001: Last 32: (lost to Alan Warriner-Little 0–3)
 2002: Last 32: (lost to Alan Warriner-Little 2–4)
 2003: Last 32: (lost to Kevin Painter 1–4)

References

External links
 

1945 births
2014 deaths
English darts players
Professional Darts Corporation early era players
Deaths from cancer in England